Mayfield is an area of Edinburgh, Scotland, about one mile south from the city centre, with Craigmillar to the south-east and Newington to the north.  Mayfield is also the name of several streets in the area.

The area is affluent and mostly residential, with a large number of small hotels, a few shops, and an NHS dentist on Mayfield Road.  The area is dominated by Mayfield Salisbury Church.

Areas of Edinburgh